Crash Course Manual is a 1989 role-playing game supplement for Paranoia published by West End Games.

Contents
Crash Course Manual is a supplement in which the Computer has crashed in the Alpha Complex.

Publication history
Crash Course Manual was edited by Doug Kaufman, with a cover by Robert Larkin, and was published by West End Games in 1990 as a 96-page book.

Shannon Appelcline commented that metaplots for Paranoia "kicked off with the 'Secret Society Wars' in The DOA Sector Travelogue (1989), which seemed OK, but then things took a dramatic wrong turn with Crash Course Manual (1989), which introduced MegaWhoops Alpha Complex where the Computer was gone!"

Reception
James Wallis reviewed Crash Course Manual for Games International magazine, and gave it a rating of 3 out of 10, and stated that "If you still play Paranoia, you'll want this, but if your copy is gathering dust on a shelf, Crash Course Manual is not a good enough reason to pick it up again."

References

Paranoia supplements
Role-playing game supplements introduced in 1989